Paulista is a municipality in Pernambuco, Brazil, with a population of 334,376 as of 2020. It has the highest Human Development Index (HDI) of the Recife metropolitan area. It is the birthplace of footballer Rivaldo and is also famous for its beaches, including Maria Farinha with the giant Veneza water park. It was incorporated as a city in 1935.

History

In 1535 Paulista was a village, with two parishes, Paratibe and Maranguape, and formed part of the then village of Olinda. In the mid-16th century, the lands of Paratibe were donated by Coelho to Jerônimo de Albuquerque, services rendered to the Dubuquerque colony. Jerônimo de Albuquerque, after a while, ceded the lands of Paratibe to Gonçalo Mendes Leitão, at the time of marrying his daughter. Later, with the death of Mendes Leitão, his heirs sold them as properties, dividing from then on into Paratibe de Cima and Paratibe de Baixo (Upper Paratibe and Lower Paratibe). In 1856, the parish of Maranguape was acquired by João Fernandes Vieira and at the end of this century, in the year 1689, the two parishes, Paratibe and Maranguape, were sold to the pioneer of São Paulo, Manoel Álvares de Morais Navarro, known as "Paulista", giving rise to the current name of the city.

The later centuries were characterized by both political and economic growth for the city. Paulista was the second district of Olinda until 1935, which became an independent municipality and is currently formed by the districts of Paratibe, Arthur Lundgren I, Arthur Lundgren II, Jardim Paulista Baixo, Jardim Paulista Alto, Conceição, Janga, Pau Amarelo, Nobre, Maranguape I, Maranguape II, Jardim Maranguape, Alameda Paulista, Maria Farinha, Engenho Maranguape and Mirueira.

Anthem
It was made by Joel Andrade.

Portuguese Lyrics
O antigo Engenho de Manuel Navarro

Cresceu e para o mundo despontou

É hoje palco de um progresso imensurável

Paulista, símbolo da graça e do labor!

Em teu rico solo, o choro é riso

Doce paraíso encantador

Onde os dias têm mais luz

Onde as estrelas têm mais fulgor

Em cima, o céu é mais azul, é mais bonito

Em baixo, a brisa tem aroma de eucalipto

Teu povo é mais ordeiro e mais gentil

Paulista, fração linda do Brasil (BIS)

Qual grande lençol verde se agitando

Teu mar faz do teu leste atração

Enquanto o Sol que é bem mais Sol sobre teu solo

Esquenta o ar, esquenta a vida esquenta o chão

És o apogeu de um sonho lindo

Esplendor de um dia de verão

Onde a paz reside em paz

Onde as roseiras bem mais rosas dão

Em cima, o céu é mais azul e mais bonito

Embaixo, a brisa tem aroma de eucalipto

Teu povo é mais ordeiro e mais gentil

Paulista, fração linda do Brasil!

English Lyrics

The old Mill of Manuel Navaro

Grew and for the world it emerged

Is today an immeasurable progress stage

Paulista, symbol of grace and labor!

In your rich soil, the cry is laughter

Sweet charming paradise

Where the days have more light

Where the stars have more shine

Above, the sky is bluer, is more beautiful

Below, the wind has a eucalyptus scent

Your people are more orderly and kinder

Paulista, beautiful fraction of Brazil (BIS)

Which big green sheet shaking

Your east makes your sea attractive

While the sun is way more sun in your soil

Heat the air, heat the life heat the ground

Are the height of a beautiful dream

The splendor of a summer day

Where peace resides in peace

Where the rose bushes way more roses give

Above, the sky is bluer, is more beautiful

Below, the wind has a eucalyptus scent

Your people are more orderly and kinder

Paulista, beautiful fraction of Brazil

Beaches
Also has many bars and tents.
Janga Beach - an urban beach with artificial reefs
Maria Farinha Beach - features quiet and shallow waters. At low tide, it is possible to see the reefs, and at this time, the beach has almost no waves.
Pau Amarelo Beach - features quiet water and a formation of sand banks, which give rise to small sandbar islets and natural pools.

The beaches of Paulista are a nesting ground for endangered hawksbill sea turtles.

Economy

In the municipality of Paulista, activities related to services, commerce and industry predominate. Tourism is also responsible for attracting enterprises to the municipality with the implementation of hotels, restaurants, commercial points, and marinas. In Paulista, the industrial park of Paratibe is also located, which houses companies from different sectors, stimulating the region's economy and generating employment for the population.

The municipality is part of the Metropolitan Region of Recife, which polarizes economic flows, with a predominance of the service sector and functions as a distribution center for goods. In addition to concentrating a greater number of processing industries in the State, another pillar of the metropolitan economy is the agro-industry, focused on the alcohol and sugar sectors. Also noteworthy is the cultivation of fruits and vegetables, such as bananas, coconuts, yams, manioc, among others.

Economic Indicators

Economy by Sector

Health Indicators

Notable people
Heider Dias Sotero, footballer

See also
Jamesson Andrade de Brito

References

 Video Janga beach and Pernambuco folklore 

Populated coastal places in Pernambuco
Municipalities in Pernambuco
1935 establishments in Brazil